Deondre Burns (born January 16, 1997) is an American professional basketball player for Keravnos of the Cypriot League. He played college basketball for the Little Rock Trojans and the Oral Roberts Golden Eagles.

Early life and high school career
Burns played for Newman Smith High School under coach Percy Johnson. In February 2015, Burns scored 30 points in a win against Thomas Jefferson High School to help Newman Smith qualify for the playoffs. As a senior, he tied for first in scoring among Dallas-area Class 5A players with 23.9 points per game, as well as posting 4.4 rebounds and 2.1 assists per game, and was named All-Area Honorable Mention. Burns signed with Little Rock in May 2015.

College career
As a sophomore, Burns averaged 7.0 points and 1.5 rebounds per game. Burns missed the 2017–18 season with a knee injury. He served as the team's sixth man during his redshirt junior season, with coach Darrell Walker saying, "I like bringing Dre' off the bench because he can score points off the bench." Burns averaged 10 points and 2.8 rebounds per game as a redshirt junior, shooting 41 percent from the field. After the season, he opted to transfer to Oral Roberts as a graduate transfer. On January 13, 2020, Burns was named Summit League player of the week after posting 22 points against North Dakota State and 19 points against North Dakota. He scored a career-high 31 points on February 6, in a 74–68 loss to North Dakota. As a senior at Oral Roberts, Burns averaged 15.3 points, 4.1 rebounds and 4.1 assists per game. He was named to the Second Team All-Summit League.

Professional career
On August 29, 2020, Burns signed his first professional contract with Starwings Basel of the Swiss Basketball League. He averaged 20.0 points, 4.4 rebounds and 4.2 assists per game. He subsequently joined the Metroplex Lightning of the Pro Basketball Association. On September 8, 2021, Burns signed with Keravnos of the Cypriot League.

References

External links
Oral Roberts Golden Eagles bio
Little Rock Trojans bio

1997 births
Living people
21st-century African-American sportspeople
African-American basketball players
American expatriate basketball people in Switzerland
American men's basketball players
Basketball players from Texas
Keravnos B.C. players
Little Rock Trojans men's basketball players
Oral Roberts Golden Eagles men's basketball players
People from Carrollton, Texas
Point guards
Sportspeople from the Dallas–Fort Worth metroplex
Starwings Basel players